Green Oaks may refer to:
 Green Oaks, Illinois, United States
 Green Oaks, Nova Scotia, Canada
 Green Oaks, Western Cape, South Africa